Jordan Markus Haynes (born January 17, 1996) is a Canadian professional soccer player who currently plays for Valour FC.

Club career

Vancouver Whitecaps
Haynes was a member of the Vancouver Whitecaps FC Residency program from 2011 to 2014.  He also played in the Premier Development League for Vancouver Whitecaps FC U-23.

Whitecaps FC 2
On February 17, 2015, Haynes signed a professional contract with Whitecaps FC 2, a USL affiliate club of Vancouver Whitecaps FC.  He made his professional debut on April 1 in a 3–0 victory over the Austin Aztex. In December 2016, Whitecaps FC 2 announced that Haynes would not return to the club for the 2017 season.

TSS FC Rovers
In 2019, Haynes played for Vancouver USL League Two side TSS FC Rovers, making fourteen appearances.

UBC
In fall 2019, Haynes started attending the University of British Columbia, where he scored two goals in 21 appearances for the varsity soccer team.

Pacific FC
On July 15, 2020, Haynes signed with Canadian Premier League side Pacific FC. He was initially set to sign on a U SPORTS deal, but was instead offered a fully professional contract which marked the end of a three-year period outside of the professional game. 

In October 2020 Haynes re-signed with Pacific FC for the 2021 season, and would go on to win the North Star Shield that year. He re-signed for a third year with the club on February 17, 2022. At the conclusion of the season, Haynes departed the club.

Valour FC
Haynes signed with Winnipeg club Valour FC on December 5, 2022.

International career
Haynes was a member of the Canadian under-17 squad that competed at the 2013 FIFA U-17 World Cup as well as the Canadian under-20 team that competed at the 2015 CONCACAF U-20 Championship.

Honours

Club
Pacific FC
Canadian Premier League: 2021

References

External links
Whitecaps FC 2 bio

USSF Development Academy bio

1996 births
Living people
Association football fullbacks
Canadian soccer players
Soccer people from Ontario
Sportspeople from Peterborough, Ontario
Canadian expatriate soccer players
Expatriate soccer players in the United States
Canadian expatriate sportspeople in the United States
Toronto FC players
Vancouver Whitecaps FC U-23 players
Whitecaps FC 2 players
OKC Energy FC players
Calgary Foothills FC players
TSS FC Rovers players
UBC Thunderbirds soccer players
Pacific FC players
Canadian Soccer League (1998–present) players
USL League Two players
USL Championship players
League1 Ontario players
Canadian Premier League players
Canada men's youth international soccer players
2015 CONCACAF U-20 Championship players
Vaughan Azzurri players